ABCF may refer to:

Anarchist Black Cross Federation 
American Breast Cancer Foundation 
ABC Family, a cable channel
AIIMS Bhopal Club de Football